Coolidge Middle School may refer to:

Coolidge Middle School (Massachusetts), in Reading, Massachusetts
Coolidge Middle School (Illinois), operated by Granite City Community Unit School District 9 in Granite City, Illinois
Calvin Coolidge Middle School (Illinois) in Peoria, Illinois